Perry's Landing, located in on the Brazos River in Jones Creek, Brazoria County, Texas, is named for James Franklin Perry. There is an Historical Marker for James Franklin Perry at the Gulf Prairie Cemetery.

Postal service and name change
A Postmaster for Perry's Landing was established on December 7, 1871.  Postal Service to Perry's Landing was discontinued April 20, 1893, but a new postmaster was named and service began again on March 6, 1894 under the name "Perry Landing."  The postal office continued to operate until 1929.

Perry's Landing was the original name of Peach Point Plantation. Perry's Landing is located approximately 18 miles south of Angleton, Texas.

Community development
By 1884, Perry's Landing had a church, a school,  and a general store.  There were then thirty residents. Perry's Landing also had warehouses from which local industry could ship commodities such as sugar, cotton, and molasses. By the start of World War I in 1914, Perry's Landing had more than tripled in population, with over 100 residents.  Industry grew there too, including a syrup manufacturer and three general stores.

Perry's Landing Steam Ferry Company
The Perry's Landing Steam Ferry Company assisted locals, visitors and transients to cross of the Brazos River.  The ferry could accommodate at least four mules and a wagon filled with supplies. The company was filed with the State of Texas on April 2, 1888.

Present day
Though not a central business district with its own postmaster today, Perry's Landing remains relevant to Texas history, and is still located in the town of Jones Creek, Texas.

References

Further reading
James A. Creighton, A Narrative History of Brazoria County (Angleton, Texas: Brazoria County Historical Commission, 1975).
Sallie Glasscock, "Peach Point Plantation," Texas Parade, April 1951.

Geography of Brazoria County, Texas